Milsom is a surname. Notable people by that name include:

 Robert Milsom (born 1987), English footballer.
 Nigel Milsom (born 1975), Australian painter. 
 Veronica Milsom (born 1984), Australian radio presenter, comedian and actress.
 Jack Milsom (1907–1977), English footballer.
 Edward Milsom, rugby league footballer who played in the 1890s.
 S. F. C. Milsom (1923–2016), English legal historian.

See also
 Milsom Rees